The Wisconsin Interscholastic Athletic Association's Lakeshore Conference, was an athletic conference for high schools in south-eastern Wisconsin.  Its seven member schools were the St. Joseph Lancers, the Waterford Wolverines, the Westosha Falcons, the Union Grove Broncos, the St. Catherine's Angels, the Badger Badgers, and the Wilmont Panthers.

The management of the conference is vested in the principals of the member schools. The principals determine the rules governing the eligibility of athletes and the schedules. Rules and regulations may not be less restrictive than those of the WIAA.

Sports 

The members of the conference may organize and compete with member schools in the following sports:

This conference has now disbanded. It is replaced with the Southern Lakes Conference.
http://www.southernlakesconference.org/g5-bin/client.cgi

External links
 southernlakesconference.org

Wisconsin high school sports conferences
High school sports conferences and leagues in the United States